The 2007 Medibank International was a combined men's and women's tennis tournament that was part of the 2007 ATP Tour and 2007 WTA Tour. It was the 115th edition of the annually-held Medibank International and was played on outdoor hard courts in Sydney, Australia from 7 January until 13 January.

The event was notable as being the last tournament Kim Clijsters won, before her first retirement from the sport. James Blake defended his title from the previous year.

Finals

Men's singles

 James Blake defeated  Carlos Moyá, 6–3, 5–7, 6–1

Women's singles

 Kim Clijsters defeated  Jelena Janković, 4–6, 7–6(7–1), 6–4

Men's doubles

 Paul Hanley /  Kevin Ullyett defeated  Mark Knowles /  Daniel Nestor, 6–4, 6–7(3–7), [10–6]

Women's doubles

 Anna-Lena Grönefeld /  Meghann Shaughnessy defeated  Marion Bartoli /  Meilen Tu, 6–3, 3–6, 7–6

External links
 ATP Singles draw
 ATP Doubles draw
 WTA Singles and Doubles draws

 
Medibank International, 2007